Xenotilapia ornatipinnis is a species of cichlid endemic to Lake Tanganyika where it can be found in schools in areas with sandy substrates.  This species can reach a length of  TL.  It can also be found in the aquarium trade.

References

External links
 Photograph

ornatipinnis
Taxa named by George Albert Boulenger
Fish described in 1901
Taxonomy articles created by Polbot